Supur is a commune of 4,712 inhabitants situated in Satu Mare County, Crișana, Romania. Its administrative centre is Supuru de Jos, and the commune is composed of seven villages:

Demographics
Ethnic groups (2002 census): 
Romanians: 63.99%
Hungarians: 28.65%
Romanies (Gypsies): 7.01%

According to mother tongue, 71.01% of the population speak Romanian, while 28.60% speak Hungarian as their first language.

Natives
 János Szily

References

Communes in Satu Mare County
Localities in Crișana